Addams Family Values is an action-adventure game based on the film of the same name produced by Ocean Software and released in 1994 for the Super NES (in North America and Europe) and Sega Mega Drive (in Europe only).

Plot
The player takes the role of Uncle Fester as he searches for his recently kidnapped baby nephew Pubert E. Addams. On the way, he receives help from The Addams Family and other characters.

Gameplay
Addams Family Values is an action-adventure game with slight role-playing  elements. The players control Fester by moving him around, fighting regular enemies and bosses, talking to members of Addams household, and solving puzzles. There are eight dungeons players can explore with a handful of side quests.

Reception
 
In 1995, Total! ranked the game 71st on their Top 100 SNES Games.

References

External links
 

1994 video games
Ocean Software games
Sega Genesis games
Super Nintendo Entertainment System games
The Addams Family video games
Video games based on adaptations
Video games based on films
Video games developed in the United Kingdom